Project Gotham Racing is a racing video game developed by Bizarre Creations and published by Microsoft Game Studios. It was released exclusively for the Xbox as a launch title in November 2001.

Gameplay
Project Gotham Racing differs from most racing games in that winning a race does not necessarily mean the player advances to the next round; instead advancement in Project Gotham Racing requires both driving fast enough to meet the challenge set, and scoring enough Kudos points to advance. Kudos points are gained through the player's driving skills, such as power sliding around a corner at speed, or overtaking non-player characters in the race. There are four world cities realistically recreated; San Francisco, London and Tokyo all return from Metropolis Street Racer, along with the newly introduced New York City. The game feature 12 radio stations, 5 of which are based on real-life stations (HOT 97, Live 105, Capital 95.8, Xfm London 104.9 and InterFM).

Reception

Project Gotham Racing received favourable reviews according to video game review aggregator Metacritic. NextGen said that the game "has enough gloss, variety, and originality to compete with the genre's best and give speedfreaks a great reason to jump on the Xbox bandwagon."

The game was nominated for GameSpots annual "Best Xbox Game" and, among console games, "Best Driving Game" prizes. These went respectively to Halo: Combat Evolved and Gran Turismo 3: A-Spec.

The game sold above 1 million units globally by July 2002. By July 2006, it had sold 1.2 million copies and earned $44 million in the U.S. NextGen ranked it as the 43rd highest-selling game launched for the PlayStation 2, Xbox or GameCube between January 2000 and July 2006 in that country. Combined sales of Project Gotham Racing games reached 2.1 million units in the U.S. by July 2006. The game ultimately sold 6 million copies.

References

External links
 

2001 video games
Multiplayer and single-player video games
Project Gotham Racing
Racing video games set in the United States
Video games developed in the United Kingdom
Video games set in the United Kingdom
Video games set in London
Video games set in the United States
Video games set in New York City
Video games set in Japan
Video games set in Tokyo
Video games set in San Francisco
Xbox games
Xbox-only games
Bizarre Creations games